The German People's Party was a German nationalist political party in Austria.

History
In the 1907 elections the party contested seats within the Austrian part of Cisleithania, receiving 2.8% of the Austrian vote. Its vote share fell to 1.6% in the 1911 elections.

After World War I the party contested the 1919 Constitutional Assembly elections, in which it received 2% of the national vote and won two seats. The following year the party merged into the Greater German People's Party.

References

Defunct political parties in Austria
Political parties disestablished in 1920
German nationalism in Austria
German nationalist political parties
Nationalist parties in Austria
1920 disestablishments in Austria